Lastreopsis nephrodioides  is a fern in the family Dryopteridaceae. The specific epithet refers to its resemblance to Nephrodium decompositum R.Br. (= Lastreopsis decomposita (R.Br.) Tindale).

Description
The plant is a terrestrial or epiphytic fern. Its fronds are up to 80 cm in length, comprising a 10–40 cm stipe and a lamina 15–40 cm long, 20–50 cm wide.

Distribution and habitat
The fern is endemic to Australia’s subtropical Lord Howe Island in the Tasman Sea; it occurs in forest on the southern parts of the Island, especially at higher elevations.

References

Dryopteridaceae
Endemic flora of Lord Howe Island
Plants described in 1872
Ferns of Australia
Taxa named by John Gilbert Baker